The Maryland congressional elections of 2006 were held on Tuesday, November 7, 2006.  The terms of all eight representatives to the United States House of Representatives expired on January 3, 2007, and therefore all were put up for contest. The winning candidates served a two-year term from January 3, 2007, to January 3, 2009.

Overview

District 1

Incumbent Republican Congressman Wayne Gilchrest, seeking his ninth term in Congress, faced Jim Corwin, the Democratic nominee and a family physician. Gilchrest's reputation as a moderate Republican built up his popularity and he was overwhelmingly re-elected in this conservative, Eastern Shore-based district.

District 2

In this heavily-gerrymandered and relatively liberal district, incumbent Democratic Congressman Dutch Ruppersberger faced no serious threat from Republican candidate Jimmy Mathis. Ruppersberger won a third term in this district that includes small parts of Baltimore and some of the Baltimore metropolitan area in a landslide.

District 3

Incumbent Democratic Congressman Ben Cardin declined to seek an eleventh term so that he could run for Senate. John Sarbanes, the son of retiring Senator Paul Sarbanes and an attorney, won a crowded Democratic primary and became the Democratic nominee. Annapolis marketing executive John White was the Republican nominee, and, true to the liberal nature of this district based in the Baltimore metropolitan area, Sarbanes beat White.

District 4

In this district, which has a majority African-American population and is based in Prince George's County and Montgomery County, is heavily liberal. Incumbent Democratic Congressman Al Wynn survived a tough primary challenge from lawyer Donna Edwards, and since the Democratic primary is tantamount to election, Wynn was the heavy favorite to win the general election, which he ultimately did.

District 5

House Minority Whip Steny Hoyer, who has served in Congress since he was elected in a 1981 special election to fill the seat previously held by Gladys Spellman, did not face a Republican opponent in this election. Hoyer's election to his fourteenth term was never in doubt, however, seeing as this district, based in the Washington, D.C. metropolitan area and southern Maryland, is heavily liberal. Hoyer beat out Green Party candidate Steve Warner and Constitution Party candidate Peter Kuhnert to win another term in Congress.

District 6

This district, based in the heavily conservative Maryland panhandle and the moderately conservative northern suburbs of Baltimore, has sent incumbent Republican Congressman Roscoe Bartlett back to Washington with solid margins of re-election, and this year proved no different. Congressman Bartlett faced United States Army veteran Andrew J. Duck in the general election, and though he ultimately beat Duck out, it was by a thinner margin than usual.

District 7

Incumbent Democratic Congressman Elijah Cummings, who has represented this heavily liberal district based in Baltimore, Baltimore County and Howard County since previous Congressman Kweisi Mfume resigned in 1996. This year, the popular Cummings did not face any opponent of any kind in the general election and he coasted to a seventh term.

District 8

Democratic Congressman Chris Van Hollen, considered by many to be a rising star in the Democratic Party, has represented this staunchly liberal district based in the Washington, D.C. metropolitan area since his initial election in 2002. Van Hollen faced no serious threat to his bid for a third term from Republican Jeffrey Stein or Green Party candidate Gerard Giblin, and he crushed both of them in the general election.

References

See also

Maryland
2006
United States House